Up in Daisy's Penthouse is a 1953 short subject directed by Jules White starring American slapstick comedy team The Three Stooges (Moe Howard, Larry Fine and Shemp Howard). It is the 144th entry in the series released by Columbia Pictures starring the comedians, who released 190 shorts for the studio between 1934 and 1959.

Plot
The Stooges awake one morning to their mother's cry, "Now that I'm old, your father has divorced me!" The newspaper article states that their father (Shemp Howard, pulling double duty as both himself and his father) has just become rich via an oil well, has divorced, and that very day will marry a young, gold-digging blonde named Daisy (Connie Cezon). The Stooges set off to try and stop the wedding. But since Shemp and his father look exactly alike, Daisy ends up marrying the wrong man. In the finale of the short, the Stooges manage to escape the clutches of the criminals trying to kill them for their father's oil money, and rescue their father.

Production notes
Up in Daisy's Penthouse is a remake of 3 Dumb Clucks, using minimal footage from the original film. This is noticeable when the trio are on the flagpole, as audio of Curly's "woo woo"s can be heard, the first commemoration of former Stooge Curly Howard's death on January 18, 1952.

References

External links 
 
 
Up in Daisy's Penthouse at threestooges.net

1953 films
1953 comedy films
The Three Stooges films
American black-and-white films
The Three Stooges film remakes
Films directed by Jules White
Columbia Pictures short films
American comedy short films
1950s English-language films
1950s American films